Tchiressoua Guel (born 27 December 1975) is an Ivorian former professional footballer who played as a midfielder.

Guel played for various clubs in France's Ligue 1 and Ligue 2, including Olympique de Marseille, AS Saint-Étienne and FC Lorient. He also spent a period in the Turkish Süper Lig with MKE Ankaragücü. 

Guel made 72 appearances scoring nine goals for Ivory Coast, including participating at the 1994, 1996, 1998, 2000 and 2002 African Cup of Nations.

Club career
Guel was born in Sikensi, Ivory Coast.

In October 2008 Guel stated he wanted a move to an English side and it was reported that he had attracted attention from London clubs Millwall and Charlton Athletic.

Personal life
Guel's son, Moussa Guel, is a professional footballer with FC Lorient.

Honours

Club
ASEC Mimosas
 Ligue 1: 1997, 1998
 Coupe de Côte d'Ivoire: 1997
 Coupe Houphouët-Boigny: 1997, 1998
 CAF Champions League: 1998

Marseille
French Division 1: 1998–99 runner-up
UEFA Cup: 1998–99 runner-up

Lorient
 Coupe de la Ligue: 2002 runner-up
 Coupe de France: 2002
 Trophée des Champions: 2002 runner-up

International
Ivory Coast
 African Cup of Nations: 1994 bronze medalist

Individual
 Ligue 1 top scorer: 1997

References

External links
 

1975 births
Living people
People from Lagunes District
Association football midfielders
Ivorian footballers
Ivory Coast international footballers
Ligue 1 players
Süper Lig players
ASEC Mimosas players
Olympique de Marseille players
AS Saint-Étienne players
Expatriate footballers in France
FC Lorient players
MKE Ankaragücü footballers
AS Nancy Lorraine players
Hapoel Ironi Kiryat Shmona F.C. players
Israeli Premier League players
Ivorian expatriate footballers
Expatriate footballers in Turkey
Expatriate footballers in Israel
Ivorian expatriate sportspeople in France
Ivorian expatriate sportspeople in Turkey
Ivorian expatriate sportspeople in Israel
1994 African Cup of Nations players
1996 African Cup of Nations players
1998 African Cup of Nations players
2000 African Cup of Nations players
2002 African Cup of Nations players
Ligue 1 (Ivory Coast) players